National Renewal may refer to:

National Renewal (Chile), a liberal conservative political party in Chile
National Renewal (Peru), a Christian democratic and right-leaning political party in Peru

See also
Movement for National Renewal (Gabon), a political party in Gabon
National Renewal Alliance, a conservative political party in Brazil, 1966–1979
National Renewal Movement (Paraguay), a political party in Paraguay
National Renewal Party (PNR), an ultranationalist political party in Portugal
Party for National Renewal, a political party in Mali